There are two different kana (Japanese script) representations for the romanization vi:
 ヴィ: U (ウ) with dakuten (voicing marks), followed by a small I (イ)
 less commonly ヸ: Wi (ヰ) with dakuten